Cortez Kennedy (August 23, 1968  May 23, 2017) was an American professional football player who was a defensive tackle for his entire 11-season career with the Seattle Seahawks of the National Football League (NFL). He was inducted into the Pro Football Hall of Fame in 2012. He redefined and expanded the possibilities of how a large-bodied interior lineman could be used. In 1992, he won the Defensive Player of the Year award despite his team finishing 2–14.

Kennedy played collegiate football for the Miami Hurricanes at the University of Miami.

High school and college career 
Kennedy was born in Osceola, Arkansas, but grew up in the nearby town of Wilson. He graduated from Rivercrest High School in Wilson, and attended Northwest Mississippi Community College before being awarded a football scholarship to the University of Miami, where he was named an All-American in 1989.

Kennedy was inducted into the University of Miami Sports Hall of Fame in 2004.

Professional career 

He was the third overall selection in the 1990 draft by the Seahawks, and was unsigned until two days before the beginning of the season. Kennedy was named to the Pro Bowl in 1991. In 1992, having recorded 14 quarterback sacks, he received the NFL Defensive Player of the Year by the Associated Press despite the Seahawks' 2–14 record. He switched his jersey number to 99 that season in honor of close friend Jerome Brown, and was named First- or Second-team All-Pro five times.

Kennedy retired after the 2000 season. In 167 games with Seattle, he recorded 668 tackles, 58 sacks, and three interceptions. He announced his retirement in August 2002 after sitting out the 2001 season. He was given several offers by other teams, but wanted to finish his career in Seattle. He is generally considered one of the best defensive tackles to ever play the position in the NFL. He was a semi-finalist for the Pro Football Hall of Fame in 2008, as well as a finalist in 2009 and 2011, eventually being elected to the Hall as a member of the 2012 induction class. He was the second Hall of Famer to earn his credentials primarily as a Seahawk.

After retiring, Kennedy worked as an advisor for the New Orleans Saints, whose general manager, Mickey Loomis, had previously worked for the Seahawks. Kennedy later moved to Arkansas and Orlando, Florida, where he raised his daughter Courtney and focused on her education.

In 2006, Kennedy was inducted into the Seahawks' Ring of Honor. His jersey number, 96, was retired by the Seahawks during a game against the New England Patriots on October 14, 2012.

In 2007, Kennedy was named the best athlete ever to wear the number 96 by SI.com.

NFL career statistics

Source:

Death
Kennedy died on May 23, 2017, in Orlando, Florida. He was 48 years old. According to police, Kennedy was alone when he died. In the days leading up to his death, Kennedy had experienced symptoms of heart failure, including swollen legs and dizziness, which led to his hospitalization. Following his death, Wilson, Arkansas named a stretch of U.S. Highway 61 in his honor.

References

External links
 Marshall Faulk, Deion Sanders, Shannon Sharpe headline 2011 Hall of Fame class – ESPN
Pro Football Hall Of Fame 2009 Finalist Bio

1968 births
2017 deaths
American football defensive tackles
National Football League players with retired numbers
Northwest Mississippi Rangers football players
Miami Hurricanes football players
People from Osceola, Arkansas
Players of American football from Arkansas
Pro Football Hall of Fame inductees
Seattle Seahawks players
American Conference Pro Bowl players
African-American players of American football
20th-century African-American sportspeople
21st-century African-American people
National Football League Defensive Player of the Year Award winners
Ed Block Courage Award recipients